The Williams FW13 was a Formula One racing car used by the Williams team for the last four races of the 1989 Formula One season and, when updated as the FW13B, for the whole of the  season.

1989
The car was driven by Belgian Thierry Boutsen and Italian Riccardo Patrese. It made its racing début late in the 1989 season - at the Portuguese Grand Prix - due to the team's wish to get any bugs out in testing beforehand which forced the team to use an updated version of their  car dubbed the FW12C for the first 12 races of the season, by which time the FW12C had reached its development peak and both Patrese and Boutsen were eagerly awaiting the FW13. Both the drivers and the team agreed the new car was needed to challenge the likes of McLaren with their V10 Honda engines, Ferrari with their V12 engine and innovative Semi-automatic transmission, and the leading V8 powered cars, the Benetton-Fords.

After teething problems saw the Williams pair out of contention in Portugal, Patrese reverted to the old car in Spain while Boutsen continued with the new car. With the bugs finally ironed out, the new car proved very competitive in the final two races of the year, as Patrese and Boutsen finished second and third respectively at Suzuka (though helped by the infamous McLaren collision at the chicane which took out Alain Prost and later saw Ayrton Senna disqualified). The Belgian then won the final race of the year in Australia after a brilliant drive in very wet conditions, with Patrese third. These results enabled Williams to leapfrog Ferrari into second in the Constructors' Championship while Patrese had his best ever year by finishing third in the Driver' Championship behind the McLarens.

BBC television commentator Murray Walker reported during the Australian GP that the FW13, like its predecessor, was originally designed to use the computer-controlled active suspension rather than the conventional suspension used on most cars at the time. Walker reported that this was the reason the FW13 had so late in making its race debut as the team worked hard in testing to get the handling of the car right before putting it into competition.

1990
For the 1990 season, the car was updated, becoming the FW13B. It featured revised sidepods and suspension upgrades, as well as Renault's RS2 3.5-litre V10 engine. The FW13B proved fast and reliable, with Patrese and Boutsen winning one race each – Patrese at "home" in San Marino (the San Marino Grand Prix was actually run at the Imola Circuit in Italy), and Boutsen in Hungary after also claiming pole position. In the latter race, Patrese completed an all-Williams front row, drove the fastest race lap and finished fourth, giving the team plenty to celebrate that weekend. However, the team fell to fourth in the Constructors' Championship, behind Ferrari (with whom Alain Prost challenged for the Drivers' Championship) and Benetton (which won the final two races of the season thanks to former Williams driver Nelson Piquet).

The general feeling around the F1 paddock was that the FW13B was potentially the fastest car on the grid in 1990 and that the only thing holding it back from consistently challenging McLaren, Ferrari and Benetton more often was Williams not having a true number 1 driver, as both Boutsen and Patrese (particularly Boutsen) were seen as journeymen drivers. After French World Champion Alain Prost had announced he would be leaving McLaren at the end of 1989, he began talks with both Ferrari and Williams about driving for them in 1990. Frank Williams was hopeful of signing Prost (who ultimately chose Ferrari) and many including outspoken  World Champion James Hunt felt that had Prost driven the FW13B in 1990 instead of either Boutsen or Patrese then the true potential of the car could have been reached. Upon re-signing, Mansell tested the car and requested softer suspension and different wing settings on the FW13B. The car performed far better in his hands than it had with the regular 1990 drivers, leading Patrick Head to realise the team had been too conservative regarding car set up; Boutsen preferred his set-ups to have the anti-roll bars as stiff as possible, to give the car a go-kart feel the Belgian preferred. 

The 1990 AUTOCOURSE annual published that the Renault V10 produced around 660 BHP at 13,000 RPM, while the class leading Honda V10 used by McLaren produced around 700 BHP at over 13,000 RPM, giving the Williams-Renault a power deficit of around 40 BHP which on power sensitive circuits such as Hockenheim, Spa, Monza and Suzuka would have meant the Williams-Renault combination was giving away at least 0.3 tenths of a second per lap compared to McLaren-Honda on a like for like basis. This partly explains why the FW13 was not a match for the McLarens on fast circuits.

The FW13B was replaced for the 1991 season by the successful FW14.

Complete Formula One results
(key) (results shown in bold indicate pole position; results in italics indicate fastest lap)

* 54 points scored in  using FW12C

References

Williams Formula One cars